Major-General William Robert Feilding, Viscount Feilding (15 June 1760 – 8 August 1799) was a British Army officer and politician. He was the eldest son of Basil Feilding, 6th Earl of Denbigh, but died a year before his father, leaving a son, William Feilding, 7th Earl of Denbigh.

External links

1760 births
1799 deaths
British Army major generals
British courtesy viscounts
British MPs 1780–1784
British MPs 1784–1790
British MPs 1790–1796
Heirs apparent who never acceded
Members of the Parliament of Great Britain for Bere Alston
Members of the Parliament of Great Britain for Newport (Cornwall)
William